Graydon Henning is an economic historian from the University of New England in New South Wales, Australia.

He is a specialist in Australian economic history with a particular interest in maritime transport, business, and mining history, 1870–1914, and in the lumber trade of the Pacific Northwest, 1890 - 1914.

Early life and education
Henning received a BEc. BA from the University of Adelaide and a Master of Arts degree from The University of Melbourne.

Academic career
Henning taught economic history at the University of New England for thirty years before being named an honorary fellow. During this time he worked as the editor of the Australian Association for Maritime History's journal The Great Circle from 1989 to 1998, and was both a founding member and an honorary life member of the association.

Henning served a five-year term as President of the International Commission for Maritime History from 2005 to 2010. Prior to accepting the post, he had served as the Vice-President of the commission, and had been a member of the editorial board for the International Journal of Maritime History.

References

Australian maritime historians
Living people
Year of birth missing (living people)